Passive Restraints is the second EP by American rock band Clutch, released in April 1992 via Earache Records.

Recording and release 
It was a three-song EP with some early punk/metal tracks that don't make the live set list much anymore, though they were a good example of their influence by bands such as Bad Brains. Vocalist Neil Fallon stated, after hearing Bad Brains on their debut self-titled album, Bad Brains:
"..Upon listening though [to the album], I was totally confused. I had nothing to compare it to. It was freakish. But after repeated listens, there was that eureka moment, and ever since then they have been on the loftiest of rock pedestals"
The EP hasn't had much live coverage; the only song to feature fairly regularly in their live shows to date being 'High Calibre Consecrator'.

A reissue called Impetus was released in 1997 with extra songs.

Background 
The second EP from Clutch was also to become a rare find. It was released on CD and 12" vinyl, but according to Earache Records the 12" is no longer available. It was also the second album produced/engineered with Lawrence "Uncle Punchy" Packer at his studios in their home state of Maryland.

Track listing
All tracks written by Clutch.

Personnel
 Neil Fallon – vocals
 Tim Sult – guitar
 Dan Maines – bass
 Jean-Paul Gaster – drums

Production
 Produced by "Uncle Punchy" Lawrence Packer at Uncle Punchy Stoudios in Silver Spring, Maryland

References

Clutch (band) albums
1992 EPs
Earache Records EPs